The Copa Chile 1995 was the 25th edition of the Chilean Cup tournament. The competition started on February 11, 1995, and concluded on September 14, 1995. Universidad Católica won the competition for their fourth time, beating Cobreloa 4–2 in the final.

Calendar

Group Round

Group 1A

Group 2A

Group 3A

Group 4A

Group 1B

Group 2B

Group 3B

Group 4B

Second round

|}

Quarterfinals

|}

Semifinals

Final

Top goalscorer
Alberto Acosta (U. Católica) 10 goals

See also
 1995 Campeonato Nacional
 Primera B

References
Revista Don Balon (Santiago, Chile) February–September 1995 (revised scores & information)
RSSSF (secondary source, too many mistakes)

Copa Chile
Chile
1995